Solanum bahamense, commonly known as the Bahama nightshade, is a plant in the nightshade family. It is native across the West Indies, from the Florida Keys east to Dominica (excluding Hispaniola). It is a common species in coastal habitats, often on calcareous soils.

Taxonomy
Originally described by Carl Linnaeus, it has a convoluted taxonomic history. S. bahamense is known by many junior synonyms and involved in several cases of homonymy.

Some additional varieties of S. bahamense have been described, but they are not considered taxonomically distinct today:
 Solanum bahamense var. inerme Dunal
 Solanum bahamense var. lanceolatum Griseb. (Not to be confused with S. lanceolatum.)
 Solanum bahamense var. luxurians D'Arcy
 Solanum bahamense var. rugelii D'Arcy
 Solanum bahamense var. subarmatum (Willd.) O.E.Schulz

References

bahamense
Plants described in 1753
Taxa named by Carl Linnaeus